José Raimundo Bona Medeiros, most commonly known as Bona Madeiros, (December 24, 1930 – April 6, 2017) was a Brazilian lawyer and politician. He served as the Governor of Piauí from 1986 to 1987, Vice Governor of Piauí from 1983 to 1986, and Mayor of Teresina, the state capital, from 1969 to 1970 and again from 1979 to 1982. He also served in the state Legislative Assembly of Piauí for seven terms.

Madeiros was born in União, Piauí, on December 24, 1930. He studied at the Universidade Federal do Piauí (Federal University of Piauí).

Medeiros was first elected to the Legislative Assembly of Piauí in 1962. he eventually served as the President of the Legislative Assembly.

In 1982, Bona Medeiros was elected Vice Governor of Piauí on the same ticket as Governor Hugo Napoleão as a member of the now-defunct Liberal Front Party (PFL). In 1986, Medeiros became the Governor of Piauí following the resignation of Governor Napoleão, who left office to run for Federal Senate. Medeiros served as Governor during the remainder of Napoleão's unexpired term from 1986 to 1987.

Medeiros suffered a heart attack at his home on April 6, 2017. He was rushed to the private Hospital São Marcos in Teresina, where he died on April 6, 2017, at the age of 86. A public funeral was held at the Legislative Assembly in Teresina on April 7, 2017. Medeiros was buried in the União cemetery in União.

See also
 List of mayors of Teresina

References

1930 births
2017 deaths
Governors of Piauí
Vice Governors of Piauí
Presidents of the Legislative Assembly of Piauí
Members of the Legislative Assembly of Piauí
Mayors of places in Brazil
People from Teresina
Piauí politicians
Liberal Front Party (Brazil) politicians
20th-century Brazilian lawyers